Singapore Tonight is a long-running flagship daily national news programme on CNA which runs daily from 22:00 until 23:00 SST/HKT (21:00 until 22:00 WIB/BKK) on weekdays and 22:00 until 22:30 SST/HKT (21:00 until 21:30 WIB/BKK) on weekends/public holidays, providing a round-up of all the day's events around Singapore and coverage of breaking news. The highly rated programme is currently presented mainly by Loke Wei Sue, Dawn Tan & Elizabeth Neo (Business) on weekdays, and Jill Neubronner on weekends.

History

Up until early July 2008, the show was aired live only in Singapore with a replay available internationally at 00:00 until 00:30 SST/HKT (01:00 until 01:30 WIB/BKK). In addition, a few segments of the show are available on the international edition of Asian Home News at 22:30 until 23:00 SST/HKT (22:30 until 00:00 WIB/BKK) and 10:30 until 11:00 SST/HKT (11:30 until 12:00 WIB/BKK).

From 31 March 2014, the programme was expanded to 1 hour to incorporate the Singapore Business segment (previously aired as Business Singapore / Singapore Business Tonight at 22:30 (GMT+8) ) and features two main anchors, Steven Chia and Dawn Tan. John Leong replaced Steven Chia on a permanent basis from 7 November. On 18 November 2021, long time presenter Steve Lai ended his appearances on Singapore Tonight and began the following week with Asia First. Loke Wei Sue took his place.

Singapore Tonight is one of only two main English national newscasts available in Singapore; the other being Channel 5's News Tonight.

Presenters

Main presenters
Loke Wei Sue
Dawn Tan
Elizabeth Neo (Business)

Relief presenters 
Roland Lim (Business)
Jill Neubronner (Main Weekend Presenter from 1 April 2017)
Otelli Edwards
John Leong (Selected Wednesdays) 
Paul Sng (Weekends)

References

Mediacorp
Singaporean television news shows
1999 Singaporean television series debuts
CNA (TV network) original programming